Senator McLeod may refer to:

Gloria Negrete McLeod (born 1941), California State Senate
Peden B. McLeod (1940–2021), South Carolina State Senate
Thomas Gordon McLeod (1868–1932), South Carolina State Senate